Toronto 1986 is a live CD/vinyl release by American rock band Ministry that was recorded live at the RPM club in Toronto, Ontario on April 10th, 1986, during the tour in support of the band's second studio album, Twitch. Parts of this performance were broadcast on FM radio, resulting in some tracks showing up on various bootlegs throughout the years. The complete master recording was located by archivists and it saw official release in 2015 via the band's official Bandcamp website. It was the first Ministry album chronologically to feature bassist Paul Barker and drummer Bill Rieflin, both of whom would become heavily involved in the band in subsequent years.

Track listing
All tracks written by Al Jourgensen.

Personnel 
 Al Jourgensen – vocals, keyboards
 Paul Barker – bass
 Bill Rieflin – drums
 Roland Barker – keyboards, saxophone

References

External links 
 "Bandcamp page"

2015 live albums
Ministry (band) albums
Cleopatra Records live albums
Music of Toronto